The Seven Cervi Brothers is a 1968 Italian drama film directed by Gianni Puccini. The film recounts the last days of life during the resistance of the anti-fascist Cervi Brothers. The director Puccini died a few months after  the end of production.  The film was long blocked by the Italian censorship.

Plot
Aldo Cervi, who distanced himself from Catholicism after meeting the Communist Ferrari in the prison of Reggio Emilia, became a promoter, among his six brothers, of resistance to Fascism. He met the actress of a traveling theater, Lucia Sarzi, who is actually a member of the clandestine anti-fascist movement, Aldo binds himself politically to his ideas. From this meeting, the Cervi brothers get the impulse to participate even more actively in the fight. While his parents host former Allies prisoners in their house, hunted by the nazifascists, Aldo goes to the mountains, with a group of other partisans. Back home momentarily, he is captured with his brothers by the fascists. At the end of December 1943, in the Reggio Emilia shooting range, the execution of the seven brothers and Quarto Camurri takes place.

Cast
Gian Maria Volonté: Aldo Cervi
Lisa Gastoni: Lucia Sarzi
Carla Gravina: Verina
Riccardo Cucciolla: Gelindo Cervi
Don Backy: Agostino Cervi
Renzo Montagnani: Ferdinando Cervi
Serge Reggiani: Ferrari
Oleg Zhakov (credited as Oleg Jakov): Alcide Cervi
Andrea Checchi: Italian Communist Party member
Duilio Del Prete: Dante Castellucci 
Gabriella Pallotta: wife of Agostino Cervi

References

External links

1968 films
Films directed by Gianni Puccini
Italian drama films
Italian films based on actual events
Films about Italian resistance movement
Films scored by Carlo Rustichelli
Italian Campaign of World War II films
Films with screenplays by Cesare Zavattini
1968 drama films
1960s Italian films